Smolensk Governorate, or the Government of Smolensk, was an administrative division (a guberniya) of the Tsardom of Russia, the Russian Empire, and the Russian SFSR. It existed, with interruptions, between 1708 and 1929.

As with the rest of the governorates, neither the borders nor internal subdivisions of Smolensk Governorate were defined; instead, the territory was defined as a set of cities, and section of lands adjacent to those cities.

History
On , 1713, Smolensk Governorate was abolished and its territory was divided between Moscow and Riga Governorates. Smolensk Province was created as a result. The governorate was re-established in 1726, and Smolensk Province was re-incorporated into the Governorate. In 1775, it was included, along with parts of Moscow and Belgorod Governorates, into Smolensk Viceroyalty. The governorate was again restored in 1796.

After the October Revolution, Smolensk Governorate was base of independent Western Oblast/Western Commune, Soviet Socialist Republic of Belarus, Lithuanian–Belorussian Soviet Socialist Republic (Litbel), and finally incorporated into the Russian SFSR.

Eventually, on January 14, 1929, Smolensk Governorate was abolished and its territory was incorporated into Western Oblast.

Subdivisions
As with the rest of the governorates, neither the borders nor internal subdivisions of Smolensk Governorate were defined; instead, the territory was defined as a set of cities and the lands adjacent to those cities.

At the time of establishment, the following thirty cities were included into Smolensk Governorate,

In 1713, when Smolensk Governorate was abolished and merged into Riga Governorate, the following five uyezds were established in the area formally occupied by the governorate (the administrative centers are given in parentheses),
Belsky Uyezd (Bely);
Dorogobuzhsky Uyezd (Dorogobuzh);
Roslavlsky Uyezd (Roslavl);
Smolensky Uyezd (Smolensk);
Vyazemsky Uyezd (Vyazma).
After Smolensk Governorate was re-established in 1726, it was subdivided into these five uyezds.

In 1775, Smolensk Viceroyalty was subdivided into 12 uyezds, which remained when it was transformed back to a governorate in 1802
(the administrative centers, which all had the town status, are in parentheses),
Belsky Uyezd (Bely);
Dorogobuzhsky Uyezd (Dorogobuzh);
Dukhovshchinsky Uyezd (Dukhovshchina);
Gzhatsky Uyezd (Gzhatsk);
Krasninsky Uyezd (Krasny);
Porechsky Uyezd (Porechye);
Roslavlsky Uyezd (Roslavl);
Smolensky Uyezd (Smolensk);
Sychyovsky Uyezd (Sychyovka);
Vyazemsky Uyezd (Vyazma);
Yelninsky Uyezd (Yelnya);
Yukhnovsky Uyezd (Yukhnov).

Demography

Language
Population by mother tongue according to the Imperial census of 1897.

Religion
According to the Imperial census of 1897.

References

Further reading
Голубовский П. В. (1895) История Смоленской земли до начала XV столетия (History of the Smolensk land prior to the beginning of the 15th century) 

 
Governorates of the Russian Empire
History of Smolensk Oblast
States and territories established in 1708
States and territories disestablished in 1713
States and territories established in 1726
States and territories disestablished in 1775
States and territories established in 1796
States and territories disestablished in 1929
1708 establishments in Russia
1726 establishments in the Russian Empire
Governorates of the Russian Soviet Federative Socialist Republic